Florence Davenport Rice (February 14, 1907 – February 23, 1974) was an American film actress.

Early years
Florence Davenport Rice was born in Cleveland, Ohio, the only child of the noted sportswriter Grantland Rice and Fannie Katherine Hollis. She attended Dwight School for Girls at Englewood, New Jersey, and Smith College.

Career 
Rice became an actress during the late 1920s and, after several Broadway roles, eventually made her way to Hollywood, where she acted in almost 50 films between 1934 and 1943.

Rice was cast as the reliable girlfriend in several films for Metro-Goldwyn-Mayer. MGM gradually provided her with more substantial roles, occasionally in prestige productions. Rice never became a major figure in movies, but she performed in a number of screen pairings with Robert Young.

Her most widely seen performances were in Double Wedding (1937), in which she was billed third in the cast credits behind William Powell and Myrna Loy, Sweethearts (1938) with Jeanette MacDonald and Nelson Eddy,  and The Marx Brothers film At The Circus (1939).

During the 1940s, the quality of her roles steadily decreased, and in 1947, she retired.

Personal life 
Rice married four times, with her fourth marriage lasting until her death.

Death
On February 23, 1974, Rice died in Honolulu from lung cancer at age 67. She was survived by her husband.

Filmography

 Fugitive Lady (1934) – Ann Duncan
 The Best Man Wins (1935) – Ann Barry
 Under Pressure (1935) – Pat Dodge
 Carnival (1935) – Miss Holbrook
 Death Flies East (1935) – Evelyn Vail
 The Awakening of Jim Burke (1935) – Tess Hardie
 Guard That Girl (1935) – Helen Bradford
 Escape from Devil's Island (1935) – Johanna Harrington
 Super-Speed (1935) – Billie Devlin
 Pride of the Marines (1936) – Molly Malone
 Panic on the Air (1936) – Mary Connor aka Cremer
 Blackmailer (1936) – Joan Rankin
 Women Are Trouble (1936) – Ruth Nolan
 Sworn Enemy (1936) – Margaret 'Peg' Gattle
 The Longest Night (1936) – Joan Sutton
 Under Cover of Night (1937) – Deb Reed
 Man of the People (1937) – Abbey Reid
 Riding on Air (1937) – Betty Harrison
 Married Before Breakfast (1937) – Kitty Brent
 Double Wedding (1937) – Irene Agnew
 Navy Blue and Gold (1937) – Patricia 'Pat' Gates
 Beg, Borrow or Steal (1937) – Joyce Steward
 Paradise for Three (1938) – Hilde Tobler
 Fast Company (1938) – Garda Sloane
 Vacation from Love (1938) – Patricia Lawson
 Sweethearts (1938) – Kay Jordan
 Stand Up and Fight (1939) – Susan Griffith
 Four Girls in White (1939) – Norma Page
 The Kid from Texas (1939) – Margo Thomas
 Miracles for Sale (1939) – Judy Barclay
 At the Circus (1939) – Julie Randall
 Little Accident (1939) – Alice Pearson
 Broadway Melody of 1940 (1940) – Amy Blake
 Girl in 313 (1940) – Joan Matthews
 Phantom Raiders (1940) – Cora Barnes
The Secret Seven (1940) – Lola Hobbs
 Cherokee Strip (1940) – Kate Cross
 Mr. District Attorney (1941) – Terry Parker
 Father Takes a Wife (1941) – Enid
 Doctors Don't Tell (1941) – Diana Wayne
 The Blonde from Singapore (1941) – Mary Brooks
 Borrowed Hero (1941) – Ann Thompson
 Tramp, Tramp, Tramp (1942) – Pam Martin
 Let's Get Tough! (1942) – Nora Stevens
 Stand By All Networks (1942) – Frances Prescott
 The Boss of Big Town (1942) – Linda Gregory
 The Ghost and the Guest (1943) – Jacqueline 'Jackie' DeLong / Frye (final film role)

References

External links

 Profile, obscureactresses.wordpress.com. Accessed August 2, 2022.

1907 births
1974 deaths
American film actresses
American stage actresses
Actresses from Cleveland
Deaths from lung cancer
Deaths from cancer in Hawaii
Dwight-Englewood School alumni
20th-century American actresses